If I Didn't Care (aka Blue Blood) is a 2007 American mystery film written and directed by Benjamin Cummings and Orson Cummings and starring Bill Sage, Susie Misner, Noelle Beck, Roy Scheider and Ronald Guttman.

Cast
Bill Sage as Davis Myers
Susie Misner as Hadley Templeton
Roy Scheider as Linus
Noelle Beck as Janice Myers
Ronald Guttman as Ayad
Brian McQuillan

Reception
The film has a 37% rating on Rotten Tomatoes.

References

External links
 
 

2000s French-language films
American mystery films
2000s English-language films
2000s American films